This is a list of people from Gadsden, Alabama, United States.

Activism
Patricia Swift Blalock, librarian and civil rights activist
Sweet Alice Harris, community organizer based in Watts, Los Angeles, California
James Hood, one of the first African-Americans to enroll at the University of Alabama

Art
Charles Clyde Ebbets, photographer
John Solomon Sandridge, painter, sculptor, artist

Athletics
Lou Allen, former NFL offensive lineman
Ron Billingsley, retired football player
Michael Boley, professional football linebacker
Dave Bustion, former professional basketball player
Chris Davis, mixed martial arts fighter
Alan Dunn, former professional baseball player
Jim Dunn, former professional baseball pitcher
Danny Ford, former college football coach for the Clemson University Tigers
Hersh Freeman, former Major League Baseball player and minor league manager
Jenks Gillem, former football player and coach
Bill Green, former basketball player for Colorado State University
Steve Grissom, NASCAR driver
Jim Guthrie, former driver in the Indy Racing League
Brick Haley, collegiate defensive line coach
Jerrell Harris, NFL linebacker
La'Donte Harris, former wide receiver for the Clemson Tigers
George Herring, former professional football quarterback and punter
Stacy Jones, former Major League Baseball pitcher
Dre Kirkpatrick, defensive back for the University of Alabama Crimson Tide football team
Freddie Kitchens, Head Coach for the Cleveland Browns
Aaron Pearson, football player
Willie Scott, former professional basketball player
Steve Shields, retired baseball player
Ted Sizemore, former major league baseball player
Warren Smith, former professional golfer
Jason Smoots, sprinter
Jerry Watford, football player
Carnell Williams, running back for Tampa Bay Buccaneers

Business
Milton K. Cummings, former cotton broker and space-defense business executive

Education
Theodore J. Lowi, Cornell University professor, author, and past president of the American Political Science Association
Michael G. Scales, president of Nyack College

Government and law
James B. Allen, former United States Senator
Marion Blakey, former United States Federal Aviation Administration (FAA) Administrator
H. Dean Buttram Jr., former United States federal judge
Craig Ford, member of the Alabama House of Representatives
Ira Roe Foster, Quartermaster General of Georgia, member of the Alabama Senate
George C. Hawkins, member of both houses of the Alabama legislature; unsuccessful Democratic candidate for the United States House of Representatives in 1964
James D. Martin, former United States Representative, pioneer Republican political figure in Alabama
Roy Moore, controversial "Ten Commandments" judge
John Perkins Ralls, physician who served in the First Confederate Congress
Emma Sansom, aided the Southern Confederacy during the Civil War
Pat Swindall, member of the U.S. House of Representatives from Georgia's 4th congressional district from 1985 to 1989

Literature
Linda Howard, romance novelist
Jake Adam York, poet

Military
Isaac Foote Dortch, captain in the United States Navy who was awarded the Navy Cross for actions during World War I
Edgar Huff, first African-American in the United States Marine Corps to be promoted to the rank of sergeant major
William L. Sibert, United States Army major general, considered the "Father of the U.S. Army Chemical Corps"
Gary D. Speer, U.S. Army lieutenant general

Modeling
Holley Ann Dorrough, former Playboy Playmate

Music
Jean Cox, former tenor and opera singer
Bradley Gaskin, country music singer
Gold City, Southern gospel group
Rex Griffin, country music singer and songwriter
Mathew Knowles, manager of Destiny's Child and father of Beyoncé Knowles
Grant Langston, singer-songwriter
Eric Martin, lead singer for rock group Mr. Big
Aimee Mayo, songwriter
Danny Mayo, songwriter
Jerry McCain, blues artist
Tommy Stewart, trumpeter and 1988 inductee into the Alabama Jazz Hall of Fame
Yelawolf, rapper, signed to Shady Records

Science
Jennie Patrick, pioneer of research on supercritical fluid extraction

Television and film
Phillip Alford, former actor, noted for his role in To Kill a Mockingbird
Beth Grant, actress
Britt Leach, actor
Sunny Mabrey, actress

References

Gadsden
Gadsen